Granada is a Colombian town and municipality in the Cundinamarca Department..

Municipalities of Cundinamarca Department